Jesper Mattsson (born May 13, 1975) is a retired Swedish professional ice hockey centre. He was drafted by the Calgary Flames in the 1993 NHL Entry Draft in the 1st round as the 18th pick overall.

Career
When Mattsson was a junior, he was considered to be a big star in the future and in 1991, at just 16 years old, he played in Elitserien for his hometown club Malmö IF and before turing 19, he had won the Swedish championship twice (1992 and 1994). In 1993 Calgary Flames drafted him 18th overall in the 1993 NHL Draft.
After his fourth season in Elitserien with Malmö IF, Mattsson signed a contract with the Flames. But Mattsson had a rough time in North America, and despite two and half seasons there he never dressed for a single Flames game, and played exclusively with Calgary's farm team, the Saint John Flames of the AHL. During his third season with Saint John he decided to move back to Sweden and Malmö IF and he finished the season with Malmö. He continued to play with Malmö for another six years with varied results.

In the summer of 2004 he decided it was time to move again and this time he signed a three-year contract with Malmö rival SEL team, Färjestad BK. His first seasons with Färjestad was a big disappointment, he only scored 15 points in 48 games, his worst season since 1994. But he played better in the playoffs, scoring 8 points in 15 games. But despite Mattsson's effort Färjestad lost in the finals against Frölunda HC. In his second season with Färjestad he showed the fans that he could play better and he scored 32 points (19 goals, 13 assists) in 45 games. His 19 goals was career high for Mattsson. Mattsson had a good post-season that year as well, tallying 17 points in 18 games, and helped Färjestad capture the Swedish championship.

For the 2010–11 season, Jesper Mattsson returned to Malmö, this time in the second-tier league HockeyAllsvenskan. He played there for two seasons, scoring 58 points in 77 games. After the 2011–12 season, Mattsson retired from ice hockey as he was not offered a new contract with Malmö.

Changing position
For the 2007-08 season, Mattsson was briefly converted into playing defense after playing as a forward his whole career up to this point.

International
Mattsson represented Sweden in the 1999 Ice Hockey World Championship, winning a Bronze medal, and in the 2006 Ice Hockey World Championship, winning a Gold medal.

Career statistics

Regular season and playoffs

International

References

External links

1975 births
Calgary Flames draft picks
Färjestad BK players
Living people
Malmö Redhawks players
National Hockey League first-round draft picks
Saint John Flames players
Swedish ice hockey defencemen
Swedish expatriate ice hockey players in Canada
Sportspeople from Malmö